Solsberry is an unincorporated community in Beech Creek Township, Greene County, Indiana.

History
According to one source, Solsberry is likely a corruption of Salisbury, a city in England. The Solsberry post office was established in 1851. However, according to locals, the name Solsberry originates from one of the early settlers to the region, Solomon Wilkerson, who planned the town and is buried in the town cemetery.

Geography

Solsberry is home to the Sculpture Trails Outdoor Museum.

References

Unincorporated communities in Greene County, Indiana
Unincorporated communities in Indiana
Bloomington metropolitan area, Indiana